'Brachyopa notata  (Osten Sacken, 1875), the Black-banded Sapeater
, is a rare species of  syrphid fly. It has been observed in  Northeastern North America. Hoverflies get their names from the ability to remain nearly motionless while in flight. The  adults, also  know as flower flies for they are commonly found around and on flowers from which they get both energy-giving nectar and protein rich pollen. Larvae for this genus are of the rat-tailed type. B.notata larvae have not been described.

Distribution
Canada, United States.

References

Eristalinae
Insects described in 1875
Diptera of North America
Taxa named by Carl Robert Osten-Sacken